The Ministry of Science and Higher Education was the Ethiopian government ministry established in 2018 which has a responsibility to lead the development of science, higher education, and the technical and vocational education and training (TVET) in the country. It established by proclamation number 1097/2018 in October 2018. Hirut Woldemariam is the prior by leading the ministry since its foundation to August 2020. The ministry has been under the leadership of Samuel Urkato since August 2020.

List of ministers

References 
Government ministries of Ethiopia
2018 establishments in Ethiopia
Ministry of Science and Higher Education